Psychrobacter oceani is a Gram-negative, strictly aerobic and nonmotile bacterium of the genus Psychrobacter, which was  isolated from a sample of marine sediment from the Pacific Ocean.

References

External links
Type strain of Psychrobacter oceani at BacDive -  the Bacterial Diversity Metadatabase

Further reading
 

Moraxellaceae
Bacteria described in 2015